Zólyom county (in Latin: comitatus Zoliensis, in Hungarian Zólyom (vár)megye, in Slovak Zvolenský komitát/ Zvolenská stolica/ Zvolenská župa, in German Sohler Gespanschaft/Komitat Sohl) was an administrative county (comitatus) of the Kingdom of Hungary. Its territory is now in central Slovakia.

Geography

Zólyom county shared borders with the counties of Bars, Turóc, Liptó, Gömör-Kishont, Nógrád and Hont. The county's territory was situated along the central Garam river, approximately between (excluding) Korpona and (including) Breznóbánya. Its area was 2634 km2 around 1910. The county was characterised by extensive mining activities.

Capitals
The capital of the county was the castle of Pusztavár near Zólyom, then from the late 15th century the Zvolen Castle and from the 1760s the town of Besztercebánya.

History
Zólyom county arose as a Hungarian comitatus in the 14th century, when most parts of the territory were conquered by the Kingdom of Hungary, from a huge royal property (the Vetusolium dominium). Initially, it comprised with a territory of the latter separated Árva, Turóc and Liptó counties.

In the aftermath of World War I, Zólyom county became part of newly formed Czechoslovakia, as recognized by the concerned states in 1920 by the Treaty of Trianon. The Zvolen county (Zvolenská župa) continued to exist until 1927, but it had completely different powers etc. and somewhat different borders. During the existence of the newly created Slovak State (1939-1945), Hron county (Pohronská župa) was created in 1940, whose territory roughly corresponded to that of the Zvolen county. The capital was Banská Bystrica.

Together with the Slovak parts of Hont and Gömör, it became part of the Banská Bystrica Region (Banskobystrický kraj) created in 1948. In 1993, Czechoslovakia was split and the Zvolen county became part of Slovakia.

Demographics

Subdivisions

In the early 20th century, the subdivisions of Zólyom county were:

Notes

References 

Counties in the Kingdom of Hungary